Ketura Woodlyne Robuste (born 25 April 1992), known as Woodlyne Robuste, is a Haitian footballer who plays as a midfielder. She has been a member of the Haiti women's national team.

International goals
Scores and results list Haiti's goal tally first

References

External links 
 

1992 births
Living people
Women's association football midfielders
Haitian women's footballers
Haiti women's international footballers
Competitors at the 2014 Central American and Caribbean Games
Haitian expatriate footballers
Haitian expatriate sportspeople in the United States
Expatriate women's soccer players in the United States